The eastern mudsnail, Ilyanassa obsoleta, is a species of sea snail, a marine gastropod mollusk in the family Nassariidae, the nassa mud snails.

Shell description
This species has a small shell with a slightly rough exterior, because the surface has intersecting weak spiral and axial ribs. The shell has an oval aperture with a small notch or siphonal canal at the anterior end. The aperture has a smooth inner lip with a partial shield, and the outer lip is thin and smooth.

The exterior of the shell is chalky white, but it is covered by a very dark brown, closely adhering periostracum, except in areas of the shell where the periostracum has been eroded. The apex of the shell is almost always eroded, and the shell is often quite damaged by the acidic properties of the mud in which the animal lives.

The maximum shell length is a little more than one inch, or about 28 mm.

Distribution
The indigenous distribution of this western Atlantic species is from Nova Scotia to Georgia in the United States.

The nonindigenous distribution includes the West Coast of the United States.

Ecology

Habitat 
This snail is very common on mud flats in the intertidal and shallow subtidal zones, in sounds and inlets.

Feeding habits 
This species is a detritus feeder, eating whatever is found in the film on top of the mud where it lives, including many microscopic marine plants.

References
Notes

 Cernohorsky W. O. (1984). Systematics of the family Nassariidae (Mollusca: Gastropoda). Bulletin of the Auckland Institute and Museum 14: 1-356.
 Brunel, P., L. Bosse, & G. Lamarche. (1998). Catalogue of the marine invertebrates of the estuary and Gulf of St. Lawrence. Canadian Special Publication of Fisheries and Aquatic Sciences, 126. 405 p.

External links 

  Goulding MQ. 2009. Cell Lineage of the Ilyanassa Embryo: Evolutionary Acceleration of Regional Differentiation during Early Development. PLoS ONE 4(5): e5506. 
 Blakeman Smith, Journal of Molluscan Studies
 Kelaher et al., J Experimental Marine Biology and Ecology
 
  Yang, Y.; Abalde, S.; Afonso, C. L.; Tenorio, M. J.; Puillandre, N.; Templado, J.; Zardoya, R. (2021). Mitogenomic phylogeny of mud snails of the mostly Atlantic/Mediterranean genus Tritia (Gastropoda: Nassariidae). Zoologica Scripta

Ilyanassa
Gastropods described in 1822